Beaugency is a commune in the Loiret department, Centre-Val de Loire, north-central France. It is located on the Loire river, upriver (northeast) from Blois and downriver from Orléans.

History
11 March 1152 the council of Beaugency annulled the marriage between Eleanor of Aquitaine and Louis VII.

Aaron ben Joseph of Beaugency and Eliezer of Beaugency were Bible commentators and rabbinical scholars, who flourished in the twelfth century in the city.

The lords of Beaugency attained considerable importance in the 11th, 12th and 13th centuries; at the end of the 13th century they sold the fiefdom to the Crown. They were responsible for building Château de Beaugency, which as originally a wooden structure and later replaced with a stone one. The massive original keep is today a ruined shell, surrounded by a mansion built later on in the 14th century.

Afterward it passed to the house of Orléans, then to those of Dunois and Longueville, and ultimately again to that of Orléans.

The city of Beaugency has been the site of numerous military conflicts.  It was occupied on four separate occasions by the English. On 16–17 June 1429, it was the site of the famous Battle of Beaugency, when it was freed by Joan of Arc. Beaugency also played an important strategic role in the Hundred Years' War. It was burned by the Protestants in 1567 and suffered extensive damage to the walls, the castle, and the church.

On 8, 9 and 10 December 1870 the Prussian army, commanded by the grand-duke of Mecklenburg, defeated the French army of the Loire, under General Chanzy, in the second battle of Beaugency (or Villorceau-Josnes).  It was fought on the right bank of the Loire to the northwest of Beaugency.

In 1940 and again in 1944, the city was bombed by Nazi Germany. On 16 September 1944, German Major General Botho Henning Elster and his 18 850 men and 754 officers surrendered at the Loire bridge of Beaugency to the U.S. Army after being harassed and surrounded by the French Résistance.

Population

Economy
Until 1846 Beaugency was an important commercial center due to trade along the Loire. After trade moved from the river to rail traffic, the city's role changed.  Beaugency became a market center for the surrounding agricultural district. Today Beaugency's economy depends largely on tourism.

Sights

 Medieval keep (11th century) 
 Lock of Dunois (14-15th century)
 Church Saint Etienne (11th century)
 Abbey church (12th century)
 City hall (16th century)
 Bridge (14th century)

References

External links

 www.beaugency.fr, official website
 Beaugency yesterday, vintage cards

Communes of Loiret
Orléanais